Handley's nectar bat (Lonchophylla handleyi) is a species of bat in the family Phyllostomidae. It is found in Colombia, Ecuador, and Peru.

References

Lonchophylla
Bats of South America
Mammals of Colombia
Mammals of Ecuador
Mammals of Peru
Mammals described in 1980
Taxonomy articles created by Polbot